Murga is a former town in the Central West region of New South Wales, Australia. At the 2006 census, Murga locality had a population of 199.

Murga was once a stop at the Cobb and Co stagecoach line from Orange to Forbes. It was located below the cliffs of the Nangar Range, now the Nangar National Park, along the Mandagery Creek. By 1862 the town had a population of 100 people. With the end of the stagecoach era the town dwindled but remained a timber milling centre with its own school. Today nothing remains of Murga but the old post office which is now a private home.

References

External links

Towns in New South Wales
Towns in the Central West (New South Wales)